Coniston may refer to:

Australia
Coniston (Northern Territory), a cattle station
Coniston massacre, 1928
Coniston, New South Wales
Coniston railway station, New South Wales
Coniston, Tasmania, a town in the Derwent Valley

United Kingdom
Coniston, East Riding of Yorkshire
Coniston Cold, North Yorkshire
Coniston, Cumbria, a village
Coniston Fells, a chain of hills and mountains in the Furness Fells, in the Lake District
Coniston Old Man (also called the Old Man of Coniston), the highest peak in the Coniston Fells
Coniston Water, a lake in the Lake District
Coniston Limestone, the sedimentary rock formation around Coniston, Cumbria.
Coniston Group, a lithographic group named after Coniston, Cumbria.

United States
Coniston, California
Coniston (novel), by American writer Winston Churchill

Canada
Coniston, Ontario, Canada

See also
Conistone, a village in Yorkshire, England